Tellurium nitride describes chemical compounds of Te containing N3−. Efforts have been made toward the binary nitrides but the results are inconclusive and it appears that such materials are unstable. Still unconfirmed is Te4N4, which would be an analogue of Se4N4 and tetrasulfur tetranitride (S4N4).  It has long been known that ammonia reacts with tellurium tetrachloride, which is similar to the method of synthesis of S4N4.   The reaction of TeCl4 with a THF solution of N(SiMe3)3 gives a well-defined tellurium nitride [Te6N8(TeCl2)4(THF)4].

References

Tellurium compounds
Nitrides
Hypothetical chemical compounds